Makri, also known as Mankri, is a village in Syana tehsil of the Bulandshahr district in the Indian state of Uttar Pradesh.

References

External links
Aerial view

Villages in Bulandshahr district